
Maximilian Dasio (28 February 1865, City of Munich, Royal Bavaria (German Confederation)  17 August 1954, Oberammergau, Lkr.Garmisch-Partenkirchen, Obb.) was a German painter and medal engraver.

Life 
Dasio was born in Munich and studied at the Munich Academy of Fine Arts. From 1891 he worked independently as an artist and directed a private school for graphic and applied arts. From 1896 to 1901 he taught at the Münchner Künstlerinnenverein ("Munich Association of Women Artists"). In 1902 he was appointed a professor at the Königliche Kunstgewerbeschule, in 1910 a civil servant with the rank of Regierungs- und Studienrat in the Bavarian Royal Ministry of the Interior for Church and School Affairs (Kgl. Ministerium des Inneren für Kirchen- und Schulangelegenheiten in Bayern) and in 1920 a senior civil servant with the rank of Ministerialrat in the Bavarian State Ministry for Education and Culture (Bayerisches Staatsministerium für Unterricht und Kultus).

He died in 1954 in Oberammergau.

Published works 
 Der Teufel: Zwanzig Variationen in Holzschnitten: portfolio of hand=printed woodcuts. 50 numbered sets published 1919 by Die Heimkehr Verlag, München-Pasing

Bibliography 
  (1985): Maximilian Dasio 18651954. Münchner Maler, Medailleur und Ministerialrat. München: Staatliche Münzsammlung

See also 
 list of German painters

External links 
 Maximilian Dasio, Geburtstagsschrift 1920 
 

20th-century German sculptors
20th-century German male artists
19th-century sculptors
German male sculptors
19th-century German painters
19th-century German male artists
20th-century German painters
German male painters
German medallists
German people of Italian descent
People from the Kingdom of Bavaria
Artists from Munich
People from Garmisch-Partenkirchen (district)
1865 births
1954 deaths